Anil Kapoor (born 24 December 1956) is an Indian actor and producer who works primarily in Hindi films, besides television and international films and television. In a career spanning over 40 years as an actor and since 2005 as a producer, Kapoor has appeared in more than 100 films. Recognised for multiple iconic, popular and cult films, he has received several accolades including two National Film Awards and seven Filmfare Awards.

Born to film producer Surinder Kapoor, he made his Bollywood debut with a small role in the romance Hamare Tumhare (1979) before starring in the Telugu film Vamsa Vruksham (1980) and Kannada film Pallavi Anupallavi (1983). His career saw a turning point with the action drama Mashaal (1984), before he established himself as a leading man with his roles in Meri Jung (1985), Karma (1986), Mr. India (1987), Tezaab (1988), Ram Lakhan (1989) and Parinda (1989). Kapoor's other critically and commercially successful films include Lamhe (1991), Benaam Badsha (1991), Beta (1992), 1942: A Love Story (1994), Andaz (1994), Laadla (1994), Trimurti (1995), Loafer (1996), Virasat (1997), Judaai (1997), Deewana Mastana (1997), Gharwali Baharwali (1998), Taal (1999), Hum Aapke Dil Mein Rehte Hain (1999), Biwi No. 1 (1999), Pukar (2000), Lajja (2001), Nayak (2001), No Entry (2005), Welcome (2007), Race (2008), Race 2 (2013), Shootout at Wadala (2013), Dil Dhadakne Do (2015), Welcome Back (2015), Race 3 (2018), Total Dhamaal (2019), Malang (2020), Thar (2022), and Jugjugg Jeeyo (2022).

Kapoor's first role in an international film was in Danny Boyle's Academy Award-winning film Slumdog Millionaire, for which he shared the Screen Actors Guild Award for Outstanding Performance by a Cast in a Motion Picture. His performance in the eighth season of the action series 24 generated rave reviews from the American press. Globally, Kapoor is one of the most recognised Indian film actors.

Early life 
Kapoor was born into a Punjabi Hindu Khatri family on 24 December 1956 in Chembur to Nirmal Kapoor and film producer Surinder Kapoor. He is the second of four children. His elder brother Boney Kapoor is a film producer and younger brother Sanjay Kapoor is an actor. The late actress Sridevi and the producer Mona Shourie Kapoor, both Boney's wives, were his sisters-in-law, and Sandeep Marwah, founder of the Noida Film City and owner of Marwah Studios, is his brother-in-law. The film actors Arjun Kapoor and Mohit Marwah are his nephews, while actress Janhvi Kapoor is his niece. The Kapoor family of Prithviraj Kapoor are also his relatives as Prithviraj Kapoor was his father's cousin.

Kapoor was educated at Our Lady of Perpetual Succour High School in Chembur East Mumbai and at the St. Xavier's College, in Fort, South Mumbai.

Career

Acting 
Kapoor made his debut in films in 1970, playing a young Shashi Kapoor in Tu Payal Mein Geet. The film, however, did not release theatrically.

1980s 

Anil Kapoor made his Hindi films debut with Umesh Mehra's Hamare Tumhare (1979) in a small role. He then starred as a lead actor in the 1980 Telugu film, Vamsa Vruksham directed by veteran Bapu. In the same year, he also appeared in two more Hindi movies – Ek Baar Kaho and Hum Paanch. In 1981, he appeared in M. S. Sathyu 's Kahan Kahan Se Guzar Gaya. After playing a small role in Shakti (1982), he made his Kannada film debut with Mani Ratnam's Pallavi Anu Pallavi (1983). He played his first Hindi film leading role in Woh Saat Din (1983) which was directed by Bapu and featured Padmini Kolhapure and Naseeruddin Shah. He gained recognition in Bollywood with Yash Chopra's drama Mashaal (1984) as a Tapori, for which he won his first Filmfare Award for Best Supporting Actor. His Tapori persona and stubble look was considered unconventional at the time, but would become fashionable in India many years later. Kapoor's 1985 releases included Yudh and Saaheb. Yudh featured him uttering his iconic line "Ek Dum Jhakaas". But it was Meri Jung (1985), wherein he played the role of an angry young lawyer fighting for justice that won him his first Best Actor nomination at Filmfare.

Anil Kapoor played a comic tapori again in Karma (1986), the biggest hit of the year. Also in 1986, Kapoor played the role of a carefree playboy in the hit Janbaaz, co-starring Feroz Khan. Kapoor's other release of 1986 Insaaf Ki Awaaz with Rekha was a box office hit. In the same year, Basu Chatterjee directed Chameli Ki Shaadi where he was seen doing a comedic role.

Anil Kapoor had a title role in Shekhar Kapur's sci-fi film Mr. India (1987), the biggest hit of the year. The film became one of his biggest box-office hits and shot him to superstar status. In 1988, he was rewarded with his first Filmfare Best Actor Award for his performance in the film, Tezaab, the biggest blockbuster of 1988. The same year also saw the release of Kasam, an action drama directed by Umesh Mehra. Anil proved to be the only saving grace in commercial failures like Ram-Avtar and Vijay. The following year he delivered Ram Lakhan (which became the second highest box office earner of 1989) with the song One Two Ka Four. In Rakhwala, Kapoor played the role of a tapori, and the film was declared a success. Kapoor's portrayal of an autistic person in the 1989 film, Eeshwar was well-received and helped establish his versatility as an actor.

1990s 

The year 1990 saw him play a dual role, as twin brothers in the highly successful Kishen Kanhaiya and in the same year he further attained reasonable box-office success with Ghar Ho To Aisa. Kapoor came up with a critically acclaimed performance in Awaargi. Many critics called that his best performance ever but the film flopped at the box office. Also films like Jamai Raja and Jeevan Ek Sanghursh, out of which both of them were remakes of South Indian films, proved to be major flops. This was a setback in his career as 1990 was supposed to be the crowning year for Kapoor as the Hindi film industry's biggest male star. But with these flops Anil was on the bad foot. This was followed by a restrained yet striking performance as a middle-aged man in Yash Chopra's intergenerational musical romantic drama Lamhe, opposite Sridevi which won her the Filmfare Award for Best Actress, with Kapoor earning a nomination for the Filmfare Award for Best Actor. The film proved to a landmark film of Indian cinema and Yash Chopra's best work to date. It was the first film in which he appeared without a moustache. Although the film was a underwhelming success at the domestic box-office, it proved to be a success overseas. Anil Kapoor's 1991 releases, Benaam Badsha was accorded average status at the ticket window.

In 1992, Kapoor received his second Filmfare Award for Best Actor for his hard-hitting performance in Indra Kumar's Beta – the biggest blockbuster of the year opposite Madhuri Dixit. Kapoor was highly impressive with his comic act in Khel and his comic timing was one of the highlights of the film. In 1993, Boney Kapoor's much-delayed mega-budget, Roop Ki Rani Choron Ka Raja was a disaster at the box-office and damaged Kapoor's reputation as the industry's biggest star at the time. The only major success in these years was Laadla again with Sridevi, a film produced by Nitin Manmohan. Kapoor gave a splendid performance as a simpleton lover in the hit musical 1942: A Love Story opposite Manisha Koirala. Anil Kapoor's another release of 1994: Andaz, opposite Juhi Chawla and Karisma Kapoor, was also a success. His 1995 release, Trimurti was a box-office disaster, though Kapoor's performance was creditable. Kapoor came up with a decent performance in the moderate critical and commercial success Gharwali Baharwali (1998), opposite Raveena Tandon and Rambha.

After a few box-office failures, he had successes with films like Loafer (1996), opposite Juhi Chawla. In Judaai, Kapoor's depiction of a loving husband torn between his two wives was appreciated and this film fared well at the box-office. Deewana Mastana (1997), Biwi No.1 (1999) and Hum Aapke Dil Mein Rehte Hain (1999) were box office hits. Kapoor's unusual characterisation of a zealous, crooked musical superstar in Taal (1999) shocked both audience and critics alike. He also won rave reviews for his superb performance in Virasat, a remake of the Tamil film, Thevar Magan (1992), in which he played Kamal Haasan's role. He also starred in the unsuccessful Jhooth Bole Kauwa Kaate, which was filmmaker Hrishikesh Mukherji's last commercial release, along with Juhi Chawla. He shaved his moustache once again for the second half of the film.

2000s 

Anil Kapoor's first release of 2000 was Bulandi, in which he played a double role, showing restraint and maturity as the elder Thakur. He won his first National Film Award in the Best Actor category for his role in Rajkumar Santoshi's critically acclaimed Pukar in 2000. Kapoor again tasted critical and commercial success with Hamara Dil Aapke Paas Hai in 2000. Kapoor stole the show as Rajeev in the much delayed Karobaar, a film directed by Rakesh Roshan, where Kapoor's dialogue delivery was appreciated. He delivered a powerhouse performance in Shanker's Nayak which is considered to be his best performance by many.

In 2002, Kapoor gave an excellent performance in the role of a fat man in Badhaai Ho Badhaai, a takeoff from the Hollywood hit, The Nutty Professor. He notched up yet another glorious performance in the Indra Kumar directed film Rishtey. In Om Jai Jagadish, he gave an amazing performance. Kapoor shared the screen with Bollywood actor Amitabh Bachchan for the first time in Armaan, and played his character of a neurosurgeon superbly.

In his 2003 release, Calcutta Mail, he delivered one of his best performances. His character was defined with ample scope to perform in this screenplay-driven performance and in spite of the strong supporting cast, this really came out as Kapoor's one-man show. He ignited the silver screen with an authoritative performance in Musafir alongside Sameera Reddy, Aditya Pancholi, Sanjay Dutt and Koena Mitra. Kapoor gave an incredibly restrained performance as the stricken husband in the thriller My Wife's Murder, which he also produced. Anees Bazmee's super-hit comedy No Entry (2005), followed for Kapoor that year. The film went on to become the highest-grossing film of the year. He was also in the film Bewafaa, playing a rich businessman who is forced to marry the sister of his wife after she passes away in childbirth.

Kapoor played a grey character with finesse in the 2005 thriller, Chocolate. Anil's first release of 2007 Salaam-e-Ishq: A Tribute to Love was a box office hit in overseas though a flop in India. Anees Bazmee's Welcome, which released on 21 December 2007 was declared the biggest success of the year. Kapoor's understated performance in Subhash Ghai's Black & White was highly lauded. His first release in 2008, Abbas Mustan's thriller, Race became a box-office hit. Vijay Krishna Acharya's, Tashan marked Anil's comeback to Yash Raj Films but failed to do well at the box-office.

His most recent films were his first English language film, Slumdog Millionaire, which was released on 12 November 2008, and Yuvvraaj, which was released on 21 November 2008. Yuvvraaj, with Salman Khan and Katrina Kaif, failed to do well at the box-office. On the other hand, Slumdog Millionaire has won a number of international awards and received rave reviews from critics, costing only US$15 million to produce, but pulling in more than $352 million worldwide. In January 2009, he attended the 66th Golden Globe Awards ceremony along with the team of Slumdog Millionaire, which won four Golden Globe Awards. Kapoor demonstrated his well-known enthusiasm after Slumdog won the Academy Award for Best Picture (one of eight awards). He also received a nomination for Best Ensemble at the Black Reel Awards of 2008 and has won the Screen Actors Guild Award for Outstanding Performance by a Cast in a Motion Picture.

2010s 

In 2010, Kapoor starred in the eighth season of the American television series 24, portraying Omar Hassan, President of the fictional Islamic Republic of Kamistan. In October of that year he was cast to play a villain in both Mission: Impossible – Ghost Protocol (released in December 2011) and Power. Power was to be directed by Rajkumar Santoshi but was shelved due to unknown reasons.

Other projects that he currently has in the pipeline include Cities (a Hollywood project co-starring Clive Owen and Orlando Bloom), Mr. India 2, the sequel to No Entry, Race 2 and Sanjay Gupta's Shootout at Wadala. He had also signed for Khiladi 786, which released in December 2012 but did not appear in it eventually. Anil Kapoor's only release of 2012 Tezz earned him favourable reviews from critics; Taran Adarsh wrote that "...it's a treat watching Anil Kapoor on screen. Though the actor has been an integral part of so many movies in the past, you can never accuse him of repeating himself. Besides, he may be in his early 50s, but that hasn't deterred Anil from performing the high-octane action stunts with flourish."

His performance in Shootout at Wadala was highly acclaimed by critics; Sudhish Kamath of The Hindu wrote that "Anil Kapoor is first-rate, revelling in a tailor-made role as a no-nonsense cop, reminding us of the superstar he used to be in the Eighties." In January 2013 Kapoor became the first Indian actor to be invited for a special segment; "In conversation", at the Toronto International Film Festival, an honour which is reserved for actors having considerable body of work. He is also currently starring in the lead role of Jai Singh Rathod in the Indian remade series of "24".

In September 2015, Kapoor made an appearance as himself in the ad for the upcoming Angry Birds Friends tournament Champions for Earth. Amazon has cast Kapoor in its pilot The Book of Strange New Things. He will play the role of Vikram Danesh, the authoritative head of the base on Oasis. Kapoor has also committed to star in Karan Johar's directorial venture, Takht, a historical drama featuring an ensemble cast, including Ranveer Singh, Alia Bhatt, Bhumi Pednekar, and Vicky Kaushal. He will also appear in a pivotal role in Siddharth Anand's Fighter, alongside Hrithik Roshan and Deepika Padukone.

Producing 
In 2002, Kapoor produced his first film, the comedy Badhaai Ho Badhaai, in which he also starred. It was followed by My Wife's Murder (2005), and Gandhi, My Father (2007). Gandhi, My Father focuses on the relationship between Mahatma Gandhi and his son Harilal Gandhi and was awarded the National Film Award – Special Jury Award / Special Mention. He produced the movie Shortkut: The Con Is On starring Akshaye Khanna and Arshad Warsi. In 2010, he produced Aisha (2010 film), starring his daughter Sonam Kapoor and Abhay Deol. The film performed moderately at the box-office, grossing Rs. 155 million in its theatrical run.

He has acquired the remake rights for the American TV success, 24, reportedly for an amount of INR 1 billion. It took him about 1.5 years to license the rights to create an Indian rendition of the popular TV show. Kapoor will be stepping into the protagonist's (Jack Bauer) role as well. Kapoor played the role of President Hassan in the 8th season of the original series aired on Fox Network.

Singing 
Anil Kapoor has on rare occasions contributed to the soundtracks of his movies as a singer. One of his first playback songs was the title track of the 1986 Bollywood comedy Chameli Ki Shaadi. The song was comic in nature and depicted the love story of the titular Chameli and her lover Charandas, played by Kapoor. Chameli was portrayed by Amrita Singh. In the same decade, he was credited on the song "Tere Bina Main Nahin Mere Bina Tu Nahin" for the film Woh Saat Din. He is also credited on the song "I Love You" from Hamara Dil Aapke Paas Hai. In 2008, Kapoor provided a rhyme-like-dialogue to introduce his character in Yashraj's Tashan. His theme was titled "Bhaiyaji ka Tashan". His co-stars in the movie also had their introductions incorporated in the soundtrack, which was composed by Vishal–Shekhar. Akshay Kumar's theme was titled "Bachchan Pandey ka Tashan". Kareena Kapoor's was "Pooja ka Tashan". Saif Ali Khan was credited for "Jimmy ka Tashan". He had one full album, "Welcome" as a co-singer with Salma Agha in 1986. The album was scored by Bappi Lahiri.

Personal life 
In 1984, Kapoor married Sunita Bhavnani, a costume designer with whom he has two daughters and a son. Their elder daughter Sonam Kapoor (born 1985) is an actress and their younger daughter Rhea Kapoor (born 1987) is a film producer and their son Harshvardhan Kapoor (born 1990) is also an actor. Anil Kapoor is referred as ‘AK’ by his children.

Filmography

Awards and nominations

References

External links 
 
 
 

 
1956 births
Filmfare Awards winners
Screen Awards winners
Male actors in Hindi cinema
Male actors in Telugu cinema
Indian male film actors
Film producers from Mumbai
Living people
Mithibai College alumni
Outstanding Performance by a Cast in a Motion Picture Screen Actors Guild Award winners
Male actors from Mumbai
20th-century Indian male actors
21st-century Indian male actors
Best Actor National Film Award winners
International Indian Film Academy Awards winners
Zee Cine Awards winners
Hindi film producers
Punjabi people
Indian male television actors
Indian male voice actors